Lancaster Presbyterian Church, also known as The Old Presbyterian Church and Cemetery, is a historic Presbyterian church on W. Gay Street in Lancaster, Lancaster County, South Carolina. It was built in 1860-1862 and is a  brick, Basilican plan church. The interior walls are stuccoed and scored to resemble stone. It is thought to have been the first brick church in Lancaster County.  It was purchased in 1976 by the Lancaster County Society for Historical Preservation, Inc.

It was added to the National Register of Historic Places in 1977.

References

Presbyterian churches in South Carolina
Churches on the National Register of Historic Places in South Carolina
Churches completed in 1862
Churches in Lancaster County, South Carolina
National Register of Historic Places in Lancaster County, South Carolina
1862 establishments in South Carolina